The Sex and Violence Family Hour is a 1983 sex comedy film with a jumble of sexual skits such as "The Big Salami", "The Brady Bang" and "Leather And Chains".

External links 

1980 films
1980s sex comedy films
1980s English-language films
American sex comedy films
Films directed by Harvey Frost
1980 comedy films
1980s American films